Turn Up Charlie is a British comedy streaming television series created by Idris Elba and Gary Reich. The series stars Elba as a disc jockey who reluctantly becomes the nanny for his famous friend's daughter; Piper Perabo, JJ Feild and Frankie Hervey also star. The series premiered on 15 March 2019 on Netflix. In April 2020, the series was cancelled after one season.

Premise
Turn Up Charlie follows "Charlie, a struggling DJ and eternal bachelor, who's given a final chance at success when he reluctantly becomes a nanny to his famous best friend's problem-child daughter."

Cast and characters

Main
 Idris Elba as Charlie
 Piper Perabo as Sara
 JJ Feild as David
 Frankie Hervey as Gabrielle

Recurring
 Angela Griffin as Astrid
 Guz Khan as Dell
 Jocelyn Jee Esien as Auntie Lydia
 Jade Anouka as Tommi
 Rina Sawayama as Layla Valentine
 Cameron King as Hunter
 Emily Carey as Bea
 Dustin Demri-Burns as Daniel Smith

Episodes

Production

Development
On 18 April 2018, it was announced that Netflix had given the production a series order for a first season consisting of eight episodes. The series was created by Idris Elba and Gary Reich who will executive produce alongside Tristram Shapeero. Directors for the series include Shapeero and Matt Lipsey. Laura Neal, Femi Oyeniran, and Victoria Asare-Archer will serve as writers with Georgia Lester also serving as writer as well as supervising producer. Martin Joyce and Ana Garanito are co-executive producers and Gill Isles will serve as producer. Production companies involved with the series include Brown Eyed Boy Productions and Green Door Pictures. On 3 January 2019, it was reported that the series would premiere on 15 March 2019. On 27 April 2020, Netflix cancelled the series after one season.

Casting
Alongside the initial series order announcement, it was confirmed that Idris Elba would star in the series as the titular Charlie. On 27 June 2018, it was announced that Piper Perabo, JJ Feild, and Frankie Hervey had joined the series' main cast. On 3 January 2019, it was reported that Angela Griffin, Guz Khan, Jocelyn Jee Esien, Jade Anouka, Cameron King, and Dustin Demri-Burns would join the cast.

Filming
Principal photography for the series commenced in May 2018 in the United Kingdom.

Filming locations included West London Film Studios.

Release
On 3 January 2019, a series of "first look" still images from the series were released featuring Idris Elba, Piper Perabo, JJ Feild, and Frankie Hervey as Charlie, Sara, David, and Gabrielle, respectively. On 28 February 2019, the official trailer for the series was released.

Reception
On the review aggregation website Rotten Tomatoes, the series holds an approval rating of 52% with an average rating of 5.26/10, based on 37 reviews. The website's critical consensus reads, "Poor writing and predictable plot twists dampen Turn Up Charlies fun premise — but those looking for a breezy sitcom starring the perennially cool Idris Elba may find themselves tapping along to its good natured beats." Metacritic, which uses a weighted average, assigned the series a score of 48 out of 100, based on 15 critics, indicating "mixed or average reviews".

References

External links

2019 British television series debuts
2010s British comedy television series
2019 British television series endings
English-language Netflix original programming
Fictional DJs
Parenting television series
DJing